Courrières is a commune in the Pas-de-Calais department in the Hauts-de-France region of France.

Geography
The Lens canal and the canalized river Deûle forms threequarters of the borders of the commune.

Nearest communes
Harnes (west)
Estevelles (northwest)
Carvin (north)
Oignies (east)
Dourges (southeast)
Montigny-en-Gohelle

History
The history of the area remains marked by the Courrières mine disaster which resulted in 1,099 deaths on 10 March 1906. All the regions' coalmines were closed by 1970. It was the site of a massacre in 1940.

Population

Notable people
 Jules Adolphe Aimé Louis Breton, painter
 Catherine Plewinski, swimmer
 Eric Sikora, footballer

Places of interest
 The sports centre Centre Sportif.
 A forest north of Courrières.
 The church of St.Piat, dating from the sixteenth century.
 The Commonwealth War Graves Commission cemetery.

International relations

Courrières is twinned with:
 Barlinek, Poland
  Aylesham, United Kingdom

See also
Communes of the Pas-de-Calais department

References

External links

 Official website of the town 
 Regional website 
 Website about the town 
 The CWGC cemetery

Communes of Pas-de-Calais
Artois